Charles E. Chapin (October 19, 1858 – December 13, 1930) was a New York editor of Joseph Pulitzer’s Evening World. He was convicted of the murder of his wife and sentenced to a 20-year-to-life term in Sing Sing prison.

Career

Chapin was born in upstate Watertown, New York and began his career on a Kansas newspaper, aged 14, moving later to Chicago to work for the Tribune, where he gained renown as a crime reporter. He excelled sufficiently to be hired in 1898 by the Evening World, a New York daily, run by the Pulitzer family.

Unlike the morning World, which Pulitzer saw as a reflection of his voice and serious-minded sensibilities, the Evening World was "a commercial enterprise" with an emphasis on crime and entertainment.  It enjoyed one of the largest circulations in the country, thanks in part to Chapin's news instincts and use of large, "startling" headlines.

Chapin was known as a hard taskmaster. He is said to have fired a total of 108 journalists during his tenure – one of them for daring to use the new-fangled word "questionnaire". Among his victims was his own publisher's son, Joseph Pulitzer Jr., after the younger Pulitzer repeatedly missed work. The elder Pulitzer backed Chapin's decision, and later sent his son to the St. Louis Post-Dispatch, where Joseph Pulitzer Jr. helped turn it into "one of the nation's best, most influential and profitable newspapers."

According to Chapin's editorial philosophy, "Gathering the news of a great city is a carefully thought-out and systematized piece of human machinery that operates under the personal supervision of the city editor."

He considered himself a newspaper man, not a journalist, and stated, "Journalism! How I grew to detest that much abused word. Every brainless mutt I ever met in a newspaper office described himself as a "journalist.” The real men, the men who knew news, knew how to get it and knew how to write it, preferred to be known as newspaper men. One never hears a star reporter along Park Row speak of journalism."

Chapin relentlessly insisted on finding breaking news and once after J. P. Morgan's security detail battered one of his reporters, Chapin allegedly told him, "You go back and tell Morgan he can’t intimidate me!"

Gaynor photograph
One of Chapin's most celebrated coups was the publication of a photograph captured by an Evening World photographer showing the moment when New York mayor William Jay Gaynor was shot by a would-be assassin. William Warnecke, the photographer, who had been lining up a portrait of the mayor, snapped the shutter just as Gaynor crumpled to the ground; Chapin's response, when the developed photo arrived on his desk, was: "Blood all over him! And exclusive, too!"

Wife's murder

Chapin's career in New York newspapers came to an end in September 1918 when, dogged by illness and debt, and concerned for his increasingly fragile wife of 38 years, he shot and killed his spouse while she was sleeping. News of the shooting shocked many of the newsman's colleagues. "They had known he would be involved in a murder some day," as Andy Logan wrote, "but had always assumed he would be the victim." Although he had apparently intended to commit suicide himself following the murder, the famous editor was instead arrested, convicted of the shooting, and sent to Sing Sing prison for a term of 20 years to life. There he wrote a memoir and became renowned for the rose garden he cultivated in the grounds, acquiring the nickname of "The Rose Man." Chapin edited the prison newspaper, The Star of Hope at Sing Sing for a short time.

Death
He died of pneumonia in Sing Sing on December 13, 1930.

Opinions of Chapin
For two decades Chapin was the city editor of Joseph Pulitzer’s Evening World. Many newspapermen considered Chapin to be "the ablest city editor who ever lived". Those who worked for him, however, often hated him. When Irvin S. Cobb, the well-known World reporter, heard that his editor was sick, he is said to have looked up from his work and remarked, "I hope it’s nothing trivial." According to Andy Logan, a noted correspondent to The New Yorker, Chapin was "terrible tempered" and in the opinion of many of his staff had "a legendary imperviousness to human suffering, especially theirs." Pulitzer referred to Chapin as "Pinch" in the code the publisher used to mask his correspondence. It was suggested that by overemphasizing sensationalism Chapin became instrumental in propagating the yellow journalism style of newspaper reporting.

References

Further reading
 Chapin, Charles E. Charles Chapin's Story Written In Sing Sing Prison. New York: G. P. Putnam's sons, 1920.
 Logan, Andy (1970). Against the Evidence: The Becker-Rosenthal Affair. New York: McCall Publishing Company. .
 Morris, James McGrath (2003). The Rose Man of Sing Sing: A True Tale of Life, Murder and Redemption in the Age of Yellow Journalism. New York: Fordham University Press.

External links

Interview with James Morris, author of "The Rose Man of Sing Sing", C-SPAN

1858 births
1930 deaths
American newspaper editors
History of New York City
American people convicted of murder
American people who died in prison custody
People convicted of murder by New York (state)
Prisoners who died in New York (state) detention
Inmates of Sing Sing